Kevin Doherty is an American college football coach. He is the defensive coordinator and linebackers coach at Georgetown University in Washington, D.C., a position he has held since the season 2017. Doherty served as the head football coach at Saint Francis University in Loretto, Pennsylvania for one season, in 1998, compiling a record of 0–10.

Head coaching record

References

External links
 Georgetown profile

Year of birth missing (living people)
Living people
Georgetown Hoyas football coaches
Harvard Crimson football coaches
Marist Red Foxes football coaches
Saint Anselm Hawks football coaches
Saint Francis Red Flash football coaches
Syracuse Orange football coaches
Tufts Jumbos football coaches
UConn Huskies football coaches
Syracuse University alumni
Tufts University alumni